UtahAmerican Energy, Inc. (formerly Andalex Resources), is  a Bituminous coal underground coal mine and lignite surface mining company, headquartered in Sandy, Utah. UtahAmerican is a subsidiary of Cleveland, Ohio based Murray Energy Corporation. UtahAmerican is a company with approximately $65.1 million (USD) in annual sales, and 428 employees and was started in 1996.

Crandall Canyon
The company operates the Crandall Canyon Mine, a bituminous coal, underground coal mine in northwestern Emery County, Utah, about  15 miles (24 km) west north-west of Huntington.

On Monday, August 6, 2007, at 2:48 A.M., the mine collapsed, trapping 6 workers inside. The workers are approximately 3.4 miles (5.5 km) from the mine entrance and 1500 feet (457 m) underground. The collapse registered recorded seismic waves in magnitude 3.9 to 4.0, by seismograph stations of the University of Utah. Emery County, the state's No. 2 coal-producer, was also the site of a fire that killed 27 people in the Wilburg mine in December 1984.

Fines
On March 20, 2008, the company was fined $420,300 by Federal authorities for "flagrant violations" at a mine in Price, Utah.

Mines
Mines operated by UtahAmerican and managed by Genwal Resources Inc.:

 Aberdeen mine (produced in excess of 1.8 million mt (2.0 million st) of coal in 2006)
 Centennial mine
 Crandall Canyon Mine
 Lila Canyon Mine
 Pinnacle mine (produced in excess of 1.8 million mt (2.0 million st) of coal in 2006)
 Smokey Hollow mine
 West Ridge mine
 Wildcat Loadout mine

References

Coal companies of the United States
Mining in Utah
Companies based in Utah
Energy companies established in 1996
Non-renewable resource companies established in 1996
1996 establishments in Utah